The Nebraska Wing of Civil Air Patrol (CAP) is the highest echelon of Civil Air Patrol in the state of Nebraska. Nebraska Wing headquarters are located in North Platte, Nebraska. The Nebraska Wing consists of over 300 cadet and adult members at over 9 locations across the state of Nebraska.

Mission
The Nebraska Wing performs the three missions of Civil Air Patrol: providing emergency services; offering cadet programs for youth; and providing aerospace education for both CAP members and the general public.

Emergency services
Civil Air Patrol provides emergency services to those in distress. This includes executing federal inland search-and-rescue missions directed by the Air Force Rescue Coordination Center. Civil Air Patrol assets are also available to state and local Emergency Management and Public Safety agencies for search and rescue operations, aerial photography missions, contingency tactical communications, and emergency transport of humanitarian supplies, blood, tissue, or organs.

Cadet programs
Civil Air Patrol offers a cadet program for youth aged 12 to 21, which includes aerospace education, leadership training, physical fitness and moral leadership. The cadet program includes an opportunity for cadets to solo fly an airplane through a flight encampment or academy.

Aerospace education
Civil Air Patrol provides aerospace education to CAP members and the general public. For CAP members, this includes graded courses covering flight physics, dynamics, history, and application. Civil Air Patrol helps schoolteachers integrate aviation and aerospace into the classroom through outreach programs, including the External Aerospace Education program, by providing seminars, course materials and through sponsorship of the National Congress on Aviation and Space Education.

Organization

See also
Awards and decorations of Civil Air Patrol
Nebraska Air National Guard
Nebraska State Guard

References

External links
Nebraska Wing Civil Air Patrol official website

Wings of the Civil Air Patrol
Education in Nebraska
Military in Nebraska